Lee Na-yoon (born July 16, 2007) is a South Korean child actress.

Education 
Lee attended Incheon Geomdan Elementary School before transferring to Kamjung Elementary School. She is attending Gamgam Middle School.

Filmography

Film

Television series

Advertisements 

 Teacher Yoon's English Class

Other

Awards and nominations

References

External links 

 SM C&C Lee Na-yoon
21st-century South Korean people
South Korean child actresses
South Korean film actresses
South Korean television actresses
South Korean actresses
Living people
2007 births